= The Oak Cliff Tribune =

Weekly newspaper in Dallas, Texas, United States (1903-2009)

The Oak Cliff Tribune was a Dallas, Texas, weekly newspaper that focused on the Oak Cliff community. It ran from 1903 until February 5, 2009, when Mark Housewright, its publisher, shut it down.

== Owners ==
- Guggenheim
- Buck Walker Brown (1878–1953), purchased the OCT from Guggenheim in 1923
- A group of investors headed by Robert Lunsford (1901–1952) and Moultrie Hale Cornelius, Jr. (1917–1965) purchased the OCT from Buck Walker Browne and DeForrest Kline (1889–1966) in September 1946
- Mark Housewright (born 1948), publisher of the Tribune from September 1997 to February 2009 (11 years, 6 months)

The Tribune Printing Company Inc.

The Tribune Printing Company Inc. was incorporated September 13, 1946, in Texas. In December of 1953, Sam Hanna Acheson (1900–1972), who had been a share holder, president, and publisher, sold his shares to others, triggering a realignment in management. As of December 19, 1953, the shareholders and officers included:
1. Raymond Garber Zauber (1917–2001), president & co-publisher
2. John N. Patton, Jr. (1921–1989), vice-president & co-publisher
3. Moultrie Hale Cornelius, Jr. (1917–1965), vice president
4. Ruth McCombs, vice president
5. Shelby S. Cox, secretary & attorney
6. Susan Eleanor Lunsford (née Fullilove; 1903–1973), treasurer (widow of former share holder, Robert Lunsford)
7. Mrs. Ray Zauber, assistant secretary
8. Mrs. John Patton, assistant secretary

As of January 13, 1956, the following officers were added:
1. H. Cal Kincaid, vice president & director
2. Manuel Conrad DeBusk (born 1914), director (Dallas attorney)
